A tattie scone (tottie scone) or potato scone  is a regional variant of the savoury griddle scone which is especially popular in Scotland. Many variations of the recipe exist. They generally include liberal quantities of boiled potatoes, butter and salt.

Preparation
A typical tattie scone is made with mashed potato (potato and butter—no milk is used—with salt to taste) and plain flour is added to make it into a dough which is then rolled out and put on a griddle (Scots: girdle) to cook. Tattie scones contain a small proportion of flour to a large proportion of potatoes: one traditional recipe calls for two ounces of flour and half an ounce of butter to a pound of potatoes.

Serving
Tattie scones are traditionally made as circles about 6 inches (15 cm) across and then cut into quarters, or farls. They may also be baked in small rounds.  They are generally unleavened and thin. They are traditionally served hot, and cold potato scones are often reheated by toasting or frying. They are often served as part of the full Scottish breakfast with fried eggs, bacon and Lorne sausage. Alternatively, they are eaten in a roll, usually accompanied with either Lorne sausage, bacon, or fried egg. They can also be eaten like a wheat scone with jam and a cup of strong tea.

See also 
 Staffordshire oatcake
 Scone
 List of British breads
 Lancashire Potato cake

References 

British breads
Unleavened breads
Potato dishes
Scottish breads
Potato pancakes